Amarte Es Un Placer Tour (English: Loving You Is a Pleasure Tour) was a concert tour by Luis Miguel to promote his album Amarte Es Un Placer. This tour had a length of 8 months and ran through Mexico, US, Argentina, Chile, Uruguay, Venezuela, Brazil and Spain between 1999 and 2000. It was the highest-grossing tour ever made by a Spanish-speaking artist, as well as the most extended. The tour consisted of 99 concerts, and was attended by approximately 1.5 million fans. These two records have been broken by another tour of the same artist, the Mexico En La Piel Tour.

History
To promote Amarte Es un Placer, Luis Miguel began his Amarte Es Un Placer Tour on 9 September 1999  in Gijón, Spain. In Madrid, he performed three sold-out shows, and spent a month touring in Spain. His performances in Madrid, Barcelona, Sevilla, Tenerife, and Marbella were among the country's highest grossing shows of 1999. Miguel then toured South America where he performed in Argentina, Brazil, Chile, Uruguay, and Venezuela. In Argentina, he drew more than 50,000 attendees per show at his three concerts in Buenos Aires, and more than 101,800 spectators attended his five shows in Chile, the largest audiences of the year for an artist. The first leg of the tour ended on 11 December 1999 in Maracaibo, Venezuela. A concert was planned for the San Jose Arena in California on New Year's Eve, but was canceled because the gross income would not meet Miguel's requirements.

Miguel commenced the second leg of his tour at the Centennial Garden in Bakersfield, California on 1 February 2000. In the same month, he performed four shows at Radio City Music Hall in New York City and grossed $1.4 million. He also appeared in Minneapolis on 12 February and in Fairfax on 14 February. Following his concerts at Radio City Music Hall, Miguel performed 21 consecutive shows at the National Auditorium in Mexico City beginning on 24 February; beating the previous record of 20 set by Mexican group Timbiriche, and set the record for most attendees with an overall count of 255,000 patrons, another record for the artist.
Miguel returned to touring in the United States on 24 March 2000, performed in several cities including Miami, Chicago, Atlantic City, and Houston. He later presented five shows in Monterrey, Mexico from 13 to 17 April 2000, and after a few more performances in the US, ended the tour in San Diego on 6 May 2000.  Miguel had the 23rd  tour in the country with more than $15.7 million earned from his 44 shows in the US. The tour was recognized by the William Morris Agency as the highest-grossing tour by a  artist.
Miguel was accompanied by a 13-piece band during his tour which included horns, keyboards, guitars, and three female backup singers. His hour-and-a-half show consisted mainly of pop songs and ballads from Amarte Es un Placer and his earlier career, as well as medleys of boleros from the Romance-themed albums. During his concerts in Monterrey, he was joined by Cutberto Pérez's band Mariachi 2000 and performed live covers of Mario De Jesús Báez "Y" and Rubén Fuentes "La Bikina". The shows included a large live-screen behind the stage and featured fireworks and confetti.

Critical reception
The Dallas Morning News writer Mario Tarradell found Miguel's show at the Starplex Pavilion in Dallas to be underwhelming. He panned Miguel's performance of the first bolero medley as  "rushed" and "erratic" and observed that the artist "spat out the lyrics, swallowed a few of them, and displayed a childlike hyperactivity in the midst of lush ballads". Tarradell also remarked that Miguel displayed a bizarre behavior during the concert such as using high notes on power ballads (which Tarradell deemed as "totally unnecessary") and was confused by Miguel's decision to do an air guitar while "Bésame Mucho" was being played.

Of Miguel's performances in Los Angeles, The Orange County Register editor Daniel Chang commented that he "delivered a classy show that was as much fun to watch as it was to hear". Chang noted that Miguel "emotes a contagious energy through dramatic facial expressions, fetal-position-like contortions and physical outbursts in time with the music" and complimented his dance moves and the visual sets.  Regarding his concert in Houston, Michael D. Clark of the Houston Chronicle said that Miguel "proved, once again, that it isn't necessary to change languages to reach U.S. audiences". He observed that Miguel seemed "determined to balance the upbeat with the overwrought" in contrast to his previous concerts, which were dominated by ballads. Clark was disappointed that the boleros were sung in medleys which did not allow any of them to stand out.

Jon Bream commented in the Star Tribune that Miguel's presentation in Minneapolis was "one of the most ambitious concert spectacles ever presented at the theater" and that the singer had a "captivating presence", but added that Miguel's music was "not particularly distinctive". He likened Miguel's uptempo songs to Earth, Wind & Fire albeit without the "rhythmic and jazzy sophistication", considered his ballads to be "conservative pop, bathed in synthesized strings with Chicago-like horn filigree," and felt let down by Miguel's choice to perform his boleros in medleys.

On 24 October 2000, WEA released the Vivo live album and video from Miguel's concerts in Monterrey. AllMusic editor Perry Seibert gave the video album two-out-of-five stars  and criticized its lack of subtitles, closed captions, and supplemental materials, but stated that it should not "dissuade fans of Latino music from checking out this entertaining DVD from Warner Bros".

Broadcasts and recordings

Was launched a CD and DVD, titled Vivo, the CD was released on October 3, 2000, while the video album was released on October 24. It was filmed at the Auditorio Coca-Cola concert hall in Monterrey, Mexico, where Miguel performed from 13 to 17 April 2000, as part of the second leg of his tour. Vivo is the first Spanish-language live album to be released on NTSC, PAL, and DVD formats. The audio version was produced by Miguel while David Mallet directed the video album. Miguel's renditions of "Y" and "La Bikina", which he specifically performed during the concert shows in Mexico where he was joined by Cutberto Pérez's band Mariachi 2000, made available as singles for the album.

Miguel received several accolades, including a Grammy nomination for Best Latin Pop Album and a Latin Grammy nomination for Best Male Pop Vocal Album. Commercially, the album peaked at number two on the albums chart in Spain and on the Billboard Top Latin Albums chart in the United States. It also topped the albums chart in Argentina and was certified double Platinum and triple Platinum and Gold in Mexico.
 
On the first leg of the tour, in Argentina Canal 13 aired a 90-minute special with the complete show of November 5, 1999 at José Amalfitani Stadium, with a 50,000 sold-out. Also in Chile the November 20 show at Estadio Nacional was fully recorded, for a partial 60-minute transmission a few days later by UC13.

Tour Set List

Tour dates

Cancelled shows

Tour personnel
Personnel adapted from Allmusic and as per Vivo DVD end credits.

Performance credits

Band
 Luis Miguel - Vocals
 Francisco Loyo - Piano, Keyboards
 Victor Loyo - Drums
 Gerardo Carrillo - Bass
 Todd Robinson - Acoustic guitar, Electric guitar
 Tommy Aros - Percussion
 Arturo Pérez - Keyboards
 Francisco Abonce - Trumpet
 Juan Arpero - Trumpet
 Alex Carballo - Trombone
 Jeff Nathanson - Saxophone
 Julie Bond - Backing Vocals
 Naja Barnes - Backing Vocals
 Carmel Cooper - Backing Vocals

Mariachi 2000
 Cutberto Pérez - Director, Trumpet
 Juan Guzmán Acevedo - Trumpet
 Juan Carlos Navarro - Guitar
 Miguel Darío González  - Guitarrón
 Juan Carlos Girón - Vihuela
 Hugo Santiago Ramírez - Violin
 Mauricio Ramos - Violin
 Pedro García - Violin
 José Ignacio Vázquez - Violin
 Petronilo Godinez - Violin
 Benjamín Rosas - Violin
 José Eloy Guerrero - Violin
 Julio de Santiago - Violin

Technical credits

 Chris Littleton - Tour Manager
 Marco Gamboa - Programming and Sequence
 Roberto Ruiz - Road Manager Band
 Steve "Chopper" Borges - Production Manager
 Randy "RT" Townsend - Stage Manager
 Dave Howard - Tour Counter
 Edith Sánchez - LM Wardrobe
 Abigail Potter - Tour Manager Assistant
 Suzanne Graham - Wardrobe and Catering
 Joe Madera - Security Boss
 Jim Yakabuski - Room Engineer
 Mike Jones - LM Monitors
 Carlos Duarte - Band Monitors
 Fabián Boggino - Lights Director
 Pat Brannon - Light Crew Boss
 Connie Paulson - High End Technical
 Greg Walker - Dimmer Technical
 Kurt Springer - V-Dosc Crew Boss
 Fumi Okazaki - Sound
 Son Nishimura - Sound
 Toshio Kumagai - Sound
 Mick Anger - Video Director
 Michael Caron - Video Crew Boss
 Jim Smyk - Video Engineer
 Phil Evans - Led Screen Technical
 Sam Herrington - Carpenter Boss 
 Richard Brisson - Pyrotechnic

Notes

References

External links
 Concert Track listing
 Tour List
 Article about the tour and the artist
 Activity-schedule of the artist during the tour (Archived 2009-10-25)
 Article and interview about the tour

Luis Miguel concert tours
1999 concert tours
2000 concert tours

pt:Amarte es un Placer Tour